Banka is a village and municipality in Piešťany District in the Trnava Region of western Slovakia, near the Váh river.

History
The site was inhabited for thousands of years, with the archaeological site dating inhabitation from the Paleolithic age.  In historical records the village was first mentioned in 1241. From 1973 to 1996 it was part of the town of Piešťany.

Geography
The municipality lies at an altitude of 210 metres and covers an area of 8.583 km2. It has a population of about 2174 people.

Genealogical resources

The records for genealogical research are available at the state archive "Statny Archiv in Bratislava, Slovakia"

 Roman Catholic church records (births/marriages/deaths): 1783-1905 (parish B)

See also
 List of municipalities and towns in Slovakia

References

External links

https://web.archive.org/web/20100202015957/http://www.statistics.sk/mosmis/eng/run.html
Surnames of living people in Banka

Villages and municipalities in Piešťany District